The Australian soccer league system is the league structure for soccer clubs in   Australia. The league system in Australia since 1977 has involved one top divisional league controlled by Football Australia and many leagues run within each state below. The National Soccer League stood from 1977 to 2004 as the top nationwide tier above the current state-based league systems, in 2005, the A-League was established as its successor. The introduction of the National Premier Leagues in 2013 introduced a direct second tier of soccer in Australia, underpinning the A-League. The National Premier Leagues incorporated the existing state leagues as divisions with a nationwide end of season finals series. In 2013, the National Premier Leagues rebranded 5 of the 9 top state leagues, and the remainder – with the exception of the Northern Territory – joined in 2014. There is no promotion and relegation to and from the top-tier A-League, and promotion and relegation at other levels varies between different state systems.

A nationwide second-tier league competition with the working title, the National Second Division, has been proposed, with a start date of the 2024 season. In addition, it has been established that a promotion and relegation system will be set up to put in line with European leagues.

The table excludes parallel leagues such as the A-League Youth, which runs in conjunction with the A-League as a national youth developmental and reserve league, or the A-League Women. The women's soccer league system in Australia is similar to that of the men's.

Current system (until 2023)

From 2024 onwards

See also

Capital Football pyramid, for a list of their league systems
Football Queensland pyramid, for a list of their league systems
Football Victoria pyramid, for a list of their league systems
League system, for a list of similar systems in other countries
List of association football competitions

References

External links
 Australian Capital Territory competitions
 New South Wales competitions
 Northern New South Wales competitions
 Northern Territory competitions
 Queensland competitions
 South Australia competitions
 Tasmania competitions
 Victoria competitions
 Western Australia competitions

Australia